The 1994 Ilva Trophy was a women's tennis tournament played on outdoor clay courts at the Circulo Tennis Ilva Taranto in Taranto, Italy that was part of the WTA Tier IV category of the 1994 WTA Tour. It was the eighth edition of the tournament and was held from 25 April until 1 May 1994. Third-seeded Julie Halard won the singles title, her second at the event after 1992, and earned $18,000 first-prize money.

Finals

Singles
 Julie Halard defeated   Irina Spîrlea 6–2, 6–3
 It was Halard' 1st singles title of the year and the 3rd of her career.

Doubles
 Irina Spîrlea /  Noëlle van Lottum defeated  Anna-Maria Cecchini /  Isabelle Demongeot 6–3, 2–6, 6–1

References

External links
 ITF tournament edition details
 Tournament draws

Mantegazza Cup
Ilva Trophy
1994 in Italian women's sport
1994 in Italian tennis